John Frederick Gates Clarke (February 22, 1905 – September 17, 1990) was a Canadian-American entomologist and an authority on moths. He worked at the Smithsonian Institution's National Museum of Natural History.

References

External links

American entomologists
Smithsonian Institution people
1905 births
1990 deaths
Alumni of the University of London
People from Victoria, British Columbia
United States Army officers
United States Army personnel of World War II
Canadian emigrants to the United States